Claude Bessy (born in Paris, 20 October 1932) is a French ballerina, ballet master of the Paris Opera Ballet (1970–1971) and director of the Paris Opera Ballet School (1972–2004).

Bessy trained at the Paris Opera Ballet School from the age of ten, the youngest student ever admitted, and joined the Paris Opera Ballet at age 13, the youngest danseuse ever admitted. In 1956, she was promoted to étoile, the Ballet's highest rank. Bessy was closely associated with Serge Lifar and created leading roles in his 1951 Snow White, 1955 Noces fantastiques  and 1958 Daphnis and Chloe. She worked with John Cranko, who made his 1955  La Belle Hêlène on her, and George Skibine, who made a second Daphnis and Chloe on Bessy in 1959.

Bessy was featured in Gene Kelly's film Invitation to the Dance (1956), and four years later he created Pas de dieux at the Paris Opera for her. She also made many television appearances. Bessy has staged ballets for the Comédie Française and Opéra Comique, dances for the musical My Fair Lady (1984) and continues to stage the ballets of Lifar throughout Europe.

As director of the Paris Opera Ballet School, she introduced profound reforms to the teaching regime which led to the birth of a new generation of highly technical dancers like Sylvie Guillem, Patrick Dupond, Élisabeth Platel, Marie-Claude Pietragalla, and succeeded in organising the construction of a new school building in Nanterre inaugurated in 1987.

Bessy was named to France's Ordre national du Mérite (dignity of the Grand Cross, its highest class), in 2009.

Publications 

 Danseuse étoile, 1961
 Claude Bessy présente les Ballets classiques de sa vie, Ed. Hors Collection, 2009.

Honors 
  
 Pavlova Prize (1961)
 
 Légion d'honneur (1972).

References

External links
 Benois de la danse
 NY Times, Anna Kisselgoff, 16 June 1987

French ballerinas
Ballet teachers
1932 births
Living people
Paris Opera Ballet étoiles
20th-century French ballet dancers